Viviennea dolens is a moth in the family Erebidae first described by Herbert Druce in 1904. It is found in Paraguay and the Brazilian state of Santa Catarina.

References

Phaegopterina
Moths described in 1904